The Canadian Library Association Book of the Year for Children Award is a literary award that annually recognizes one Canadian children's book. The book must be written in English and published in Canada during the preceding year (and nominated by the end of November). The writer must be a citizen or permanent resident of Canada.

The Book of the Year for Children Award is administered and presented by the Canadian Library Association/Association canadienne des bibliothèques (CLA). It was inaugurated in 1947 by an award to Roderick Haig-Brown for Starbuck Valley Winter and it has been presented to one book every year without exception from 1963. 

The companion CLA Young Adult Book Award has been presented annually from 1981. As of 2016, two Book of the Year for Children criteria are "appeal to children up to and including age 12" and "creative (i.e., original) writing (i.e., fiction, poetry, narrative, non-fiction, retelling of traditional literature)". Corresponding criteria for the YA Book Award are "[appeal] to young adults between the ages of 13 and 18" and "fiction (novel, collection of short stories, or graphic novel)". Two books have won both the children's and young-adult awards (below).

Winners 

There were two awards in 1966 and no award six times from 1948 to 1962. From 1967, the award-winning books were published during the preceding year; to 1965, most of the winning books were published during the second preceding year; the 1966 winners were published one each in 1964 and 1965.
 1947 – Roderick Haig-Brown, Starbuck Valley Winter (1943) (Collins)
 1948 – no award
 1949 – Mabel Dunham, Kristli's Trees (McClelland & Stewart)
 1950 – Richard S. Lambert, Franklin of the Arctic: a life of adventure (McClelland & Stewart)
 1951 – no award
 1952 – Catherine Anthony Clark, The Sun Horse (Macmillan of Canada)
 1953 – no award
 1954 – no award
 1955 – no award
 1956 – Louise Riley, Train for Tiger Lily (Macmillan of Canada)
 1957 – Cyrus Macmillan, Glooskap's Country and Other Indian Tales (posthumous reissue) (Oxford University Press)
 1958 – Farley Mowat, Lost in the Barrens (Little, Brown and Company)
 1959 – John F. Hayes, The Dangerous Cove: a story of the early days in Newfoundland (Copp Clark)
 1960 – Marius Barbeau and Michael Hornyansky, The Golden Phoenix and Other Fairy Tales from Quebec (also catalogued as "... Other French-Canadian Fairy Tales") (Oxford University Press)
 1961 – William Toye, The St. Lawrence (Oxford University Press)
 1962 – no award
 1963 – Sheila Burnford, The Incredible Journey (Little, Brown and Company)
 1964 – Roderick Haig-Brown, The Whale People (Collins)
 1965 – Dorothy M. Reid, Tales of Nanabozho (Oxford University Press)
 1966 – James Archibald Houston, Tikta'liktak: an Eskimo Legend (1965) (Longman)
 1966 –  James McNeill, The Double Knights: More Tales from Round the World (1964) (Oxford University Press)
 1967 – Christie Harris, Raven's Cry (McClelland & Stewart)
 1968 – James Archibald Houston, The White Archer: an Eskimo Legend (Kestrel Press)
 1969 – Kay Hill, And Tomorrow the Stars (Dodd)
 1970 – Edith Fowke, Sally Go Round the Sun: 300 songs, rhymes, and games of Canadian children (McClelland & Stewart)
 1971 – William Toye, Cartier Discovers the St. Lawrence (Oxford University Press)
 1972 – Ann Blades, Mary of Mile 18 (Tundra Books)
 1973 – Ruth Nichols, The Marrow of the World (Macmillan of Canada)
 1974 – Elizabeth Cleaver, The Miraculous Hind: a Hungarian legend (Holt Rinehart) 
 1975 – Dennis Lee, Alligator Pie (Macmillan of Canada)
 1976 – Mordecai Richler, Jacob Two-Two Meets the Hooded Fang (McClelland & Stewart)
 1977 – Christie Harris, Mouse Woman and the Vanished Princesses (McClelland & Stewart)
 1978 – Dennis Lee, Garbage Delight (Macmillan of Canada)
 1979 – Kevin Major, Hold Fast (Clarke, Irwin & Company)
 1980 – James Archibald Houston, River Runners (McClelland & Stewart)
 1981 – Donn Kushner, The Violin-Maker's Gift (Macmillan of Canada)
 1982 – Janet Lunn, The Root Cellar (Lester & Orpen Dennys)
 1983 – Brian Doyle, Up to Low (Groundwood Books)
 1984 – Jan Hudson, Sweetgrass (Tree Frog Press)
 1985 – Jean Little, Mama's Going to Buy You a Mockingbird (Penguin Books)
 1986 – Cora Taylor, Julie (Western Producer Prairie Books)
 1987 – Janet Lunn, Shadow in Hawthorn Bay (Lester & Orpen Dennys)
 1988 – Kit Pearson, A Handful of Time (Penguin Books)
 1989 – Brian Doyle, Easy Avenue (Groundwood Books)
 1990 – Kit Pearson, The Sky is Falling (Penguin Books)
 1991 – Michael Bedard, Redwork (Lester & Orpen Dennys)
 1992 – Kevin Major, Eating Between the Lines (Doubleday Canada)
 1993 – Celia Barker Lottridge, Ticket to Curlew; also issued as Ticket to Canada (Groundwood Books/Douglas & McIntyre)
 1994 – Tim Wynne-Jones, Some of the Kinder Planets (Groundwood Books/Douglas & McIntyre)
 1995 – Cora Taylor, Summer of the Mad Monk (Douglas & McIntyre)
 1996 – Maxine Trottier, The Tiny Kite of Eddie Wing (Stoddart Publishing)
 1997 – Brian Doyle, Uncle Ronald (Groundwood Books) 
 1998 – Kenneth Oppel, Silverwing (HarperCollins)
 1999 – Tim Wynne-Jones, Stephen Fair (Groundwood Books/ Douglas & McIntyre)
 2000 – Kenneth Oppel, Sunwing (HarperCollins)
 2001 – Nan Gregory, Wild Girl & Gran (Red Deer Press)
 2002 – Jean Little, Orphan at My Door: the home child diary of Victoria Cope (Scholastic Canada)
 2003 – Karen Levine, Hana's Suitcase: a true story (Second Story Press)
 2004 – Brian Doyle, Boy O'Boy (Groundwood Books/Douglas & McIntyre) 
 2005 – Anne Laurel Carter, Last Chance Bay (Penguin Books) 
 2006 – Pamela Porter, The Crazy Man (Groundwood Books) 
 2007 – Hadley Dyer, Johnny Kellock Died Today (HarperCollins) 
 2008 – Christopher Paul Curtis, Elijah of Buxton (Scholastic Canada)
 2009 – Anne Laurel Carter, The Shepherd's Granddaughter (Groundwood Books)
 2010 – Nancy Hartry, Watching Jimmy (Tundra Books) 
 2011 – Kenneth Oppel, Half Brother (HarperCollins)
 2012 – Kit Pearson, The Whole Truth (HarperCollins Canada)
 2013 – Susin Nielsen, The Reluctant Journal of Henry K. Larsen (Tundra Books) 
 2014 – Allan Stratton, The Curse of the Dream Witch (Scholastic Canada)
 2015 – Jonathan Auxier, The Night Gardener (Penguin Books Canada)
 2016 - Kenneth Oppel, The Nest (HarperCollins Canada)

Repeat winners 

Many of Canada's most beloved authors have won this award multiple times:
 Roderick Haig-Brown won in 1947 and 1964
 William Toye won in 1961 and 1971
 James Archibald Houston won in 1966, 1968, and 1980
 Christie Harris won in 1967 and 1977
 Dennis Lee (author) won in 1975 and 1978
 Kevin Major won in 1979 and 1992
 Janet Lunn won in 1982 and 1987
 Brian Doyle (writer) won in 1983, 1989, and 1997
 Jean Little won in 1985 and 2002
 Cora Taylor won in 1986 and 1995
 Kit Pearson won in 1988, 1990, and 2012
 Tim Wynne-Jones won in 1994 and 1999
 Kenneth Oppel is the first author to have won the award four times: in 1998, 2000, 2011, and 2016
 Anne Laurel Carter won in 2005 and 2009

Winners of multiple awards 

Two books have won the CLA Young Adult Book Award as well as the Book of the Year for Children: Shadow in Hawthorn Bay by Janet Lunn, in 1987, and Half Brother by Kenneth Oppel, in 2011.

Nine books named CLA Book of the Year for Children have also won the  Governor General's Award for English-language children's literature, or the preceding Canada Council Children's Literature Prize, or earlier Governor General's Award for juvenile fiction (in all, conferred for English-language books from 1949 to 1958 and  1975 to present). The writers and CLA award dates were Richard S. Lambert 1950, Farley Mowat 1958, Kevin Major 1979, Cora Taylor 1986, Janet Lunn 1987, Michael Bedard 1991, Tim Wynne-Jones 1994, Pamela Porter 2006, Susin Nielsen 2013.

Thus Shadow in Hawthorn Bay (Lester & Orpen Dennys, 1986) by Janet Lunn won three major Canadian awards, the CLA awards for both children's and young-adult literature and the Governor General's Award in its last year as the Canada Council Children's Literature Prize.

See also

 CLA Young Adult Book Award
 Amelia Frances Howard-Gibbon Illustrator's Award
 ALA Newbery Medal
 British Carnegie Medal – spans children's and young-adult literature

Notes

References

External links
  

Canadian children's literary awards
Awards established in 1947
1947 establishments in Canada